Iridomyrmex sanguineus is a species of ant in the genus Iridomyrmex. The ant is endemic to Australia and was described by Forel in 1910.

References

External links

Iridomyrmex
Hymenoptera of Australia
Insects described in 1910